Nazir Yuryevich Kazharov (born 12 January 1987) is a Russian former footballer.

External links
 

1987 births
People from Urvansky District
Living people
Russian footballers
Russia under-21 international footballers
PFC Spartak Nalchik players
FC Anzhi Makhachkala players
Russian expatriate footballers
Expatriate footballers in France
FC Volgar Astrakhan players
Russian Premier League players
FC Chernomorets Novorossiysk players
FC Lokomotiv Kaluga players
FC Angusht Nazran players
Association football forwards
Association football midfielders
FC Sportakademklub Moscow players
Sportspeople from Kabardino-Balkaria